Šárka Klemensová (born 16 January 1989 as Šárka Cojocarová) is a Czech model and Czech Miss Earth 2011.

Biography
Cojocarová was born in Svobodné Heřmanice. She graduated from high school in Ostrava-Poruba. She currently studies English and French at the philosophy faculty of the University of Ostrava. She also speaks Spanish and Russian.

She has participated in the Miss Model Girl of the Year competition, and won first place at the Junior Miss CR 2004  and the 2006 Miss Renata.

Miss Earth 2011
In 2011 she took part in the Czech Miss competition. At the gala held on 19 March 2011, she won the Miss Earth 2011 title. At the Miss Earth contest, which took place at the Filipino Manilách, she was awarded "The most beautiful body in bikini" (Best in Swimsuit) title. At the 2012 Miss Earth pageant held in the Philippines, Cojocarová was predicted by many to be one of the semifinalists. However, she was not selected, causing many Internet users and bloggers to coin the term "Šárka Cojocarová award" to signify a pageant contestant who seems guaranteed to be selected as a finalist, but does not make the list.

In 2012 she represented her country at the Miss Exclusive of the World contest.

References

External links
Profile at Super.cz
Profile at missfantom.cz
Šárka Cojocarová fashion video
Miss Earth Czech Republic 2011 video

Czech female models
Miss Earth 2011 contestants
Living people
1989 births
People from Bruntál District